Madres is a 2021 American horror film written by Mario Miscione and Marcella Ochoa directed by Ryan Zaragoza. It stars Ariana Guerra, Tenoch Huerta, Elpidia Carrillo, Kerry Cahill, Jennifer Patino, Britton Webb, and Evelyn Gonzalez. The film is the seventh installment in the anthological Welcome to the Blumhouse film series.

Jason Blum serves as a producer under his Blumhouse Television banner.

Plot
A Mexican-American couple who are approaching the due date for their firstborn child. After moving to a farming community in California, the wife develops unusual symptoms with accompanying horrific visions. Together they try to determine if the combination of these strange occurrences are related to a legendary curse, or something more evil.
In the end, they have a healthy child named Jose, but the infertility drugs will still continue.

Cast
 Tenoch Huerta as Beto
 Elpidia Carrillo as Anita
 Kerry Cahill as Nurse Carol
 Ariana Guerra as Diana
 Jennifer Patino as Veronica
 Britton Webb as Man
 Evelyn Gonzalez as Marisol
 René Mena as Rafael Ernesto
 Jason Bayle as Dr. Nelson
 Ashleigh Lewis as Nurse Molly
 Robert Larriviere as Dr. Bell
 Joseph Garcia as Tomas
 Betsy Borrego as Pregnant Woman
 Harlon Miller as Man
 Rachel Whitman Groves as Woman
 Amelia Rico as Gabriela
 Leydi Morales as Rosa
 Sam Fisicaro as Woman
 Sharon Elizabeth Smith as Receptionist
 Gustavo Munoz as Rafael

Release
The film was released in the United States on October 1, 2021 by Amazon Studios.

Reception
On review aggregator website Rotten Tomatoes, the film holds an approval rating of 67% based on 18 reviews, with an average rating of 5.80/10.

References

External links
 
 

Films produced by Jason Blum
2021 horror films
American supernatural horror films
Blumhouse Productions films
American pregnancy films
Films set in 1970
Films about curses
2020s supernatural horror films
Amazon Studios films
2020s American films